York Township is one of the twenty-one townships of Tama County, Iowa, United States.

History
York Township was organized in 1856. It was named after York, New York.

References

Townships in Tama County, Iowa
Townships in Iowa